The 1984 Tour du Haut Var was the 16th edition of the Tour du Haut Var cycle race and was held on 26 February 1984. The race started and finished in Seillans. The race was won by Éric Caritoux.

General classification

References

1984
1984 in road cycling
1984 in French sport